Lorna Winifred Kettels (5 April 1912 – 30 July 1997) was a former cricketer who played women's international cricket for Australia in 1934 and 1935. She played two women's Test matches for Australia, appearing in the very first women's Test match, against England in December 1934. A right-handed batsman and right-arm medium-fast bowler, she scored 19 runs and took no wickets in international cricket.

References

1997 deaths
1912 births
Australia women Test cricketers